Maruko may refer to:
 The nickname of the titular character from Chibi Maruko-chan.
 The Egg-fish goldfish or in older sources, the Ranchu variety of goldfish.